Ed Rose is an American sound engineer and record producer. He has worked extensively with groups in the modern emo and pop punk scenes. He also co-owns Black Lodge Recording with Rob Pope and his brother Ryan Pope, members of the emo band The Get Up Kids.

History
Rose held an interest in sound recording in his high school years, which was nurtured by his family. One year he got a Fostex X-15 recorder for Christmas. The next year he moved up to a Fostex 250, which he still uses. His interest in sound recording continued to grow, and he decided to attend the Full Sail Center for the Recording Arts. He interned at Studio 55 in Los Angeles. After an ownership change, he left Studio 55 and tried freelancing for six months. However, he found himself doing more technical setup than engineering, so he moved to Lawrence, Kansas in 1991 to attend The University of Kansas to get a degree in electrical engineering. He was soon approached by a friend who asked him to record a demo for his band. They recorded at Redhouse Recording. He enjoyed working there, so the owners offered him a job. His first session recording was with a local band called Slackjaw. The members of the band took a liking to Rose, so they began spreading the word and helping him get work. A year later, he dropped out from school and became a full-time partner in the studio.

He has worked New Zealand, Japan, and in Australia (where he recorded Heartbreak Club).

On December 6, 2012, Rose announced he will be no longer making records after the 2013 calendar year. The Black Lodge Studios is up for sale.

Black Lodge Studios
In 2003, Rose with the help of all the members of The Get Up Kids renovated the old Redhouse Recording studio to create Black Lodge Studios. The studios, named in reference to David Lynch's television show Twin Peaks, is located in Eudora, Kansas.

The building itself was entirely renovated, and all the old recording equipment was replaced with new, top-of-the-line equipment. The Get Up Kids' studio album Guilt Show was the first album to be recorded there, and since then the studio has thrived, having been the studio used for such notable albums as I Am the Movie by Motion City Soundtrack, Killed or Cured by The New Amsterdams, and A Collection of Short Stories by Houston Calls.

The studio also holds several recording workshops during the course of a year, allowing producing hopefuls to earn hands-on experience with real equipment in a real studio setting. Both local and signed acts record at Black Lodge.

Producer credits

A complete list of Ed Rose's Production and Engineering credits can be found at www.edrose.com

References
Footnotes

See also
[ Ed Rose's Credits] at Allmusic

External links
Ed Rose's official website
Official website of Black Lodge Recording

American record producers
1970 births
Living people
The Get Up Kids
University of Kansas alumni
The New Amsterdams members